Coptocephala is a genus of beetles belonging to the family Chrysomelidae. The genus was first described by Louis Alexandre Auguste Chevrolat in 1836.

The species of this genus are found in Eurasia and Africa.

Species
 Coptocephala arcasi Báguena, 1960
 Coptocephala brevicornis (Lefèvre, 1872)
 Coptocephala chalybaea (Germar, 1824)
 Coptocephala crassipes Lefèvre, 1876
 Coptocephala cyanocephala (Lacordaire, 1848)
 Coptocephala fossulata Lefèvre, 1872
 Coptocephala gebleri Gebler, 1841
 Coptocephala hellenica Warchalowski, 1991
 Coptocephala linnaeana Petitpierre & Alonso-Zarazaga, 2000
 Coptocephala plagiocephala (Fabricius, 1792)
 Coptocephala raffrayi (Desbrochers des Loges, 1870)
 Coptocephala rubicunda (Laichardting, 1781)
 Coptocephala scopolina (Linnaeus, 1767)
 Coptocephala unicolor (Lucas, 1845)
 Coptocephala unifasciata (Scopoli, 1763)
 Coptocephala volatica Normand, 1949

References

Clytrini
Chrysomelidae genera
Taxa named by Louis Alexandre Auguste Chevrolat